Uotinen is a Finnish surname. Notable people with the surname include:

 Pentti Uotinen (1931–2010), Finnish ski jumper
 Jorma Uotinen (born 1950), Finnish dancer, singer and choreographer
 Jani Uotinen (born 1978), Finnish footballer

Finnish-language surnames